Sốp Cộp is a rural commune of Sốp Cộp District, Sơn La Province, Vietnam.

References

Populated places in Sơn La province
District capitals in Vietnam